Dennis Ivan Vinzant (August 23, 1906 – June 22, 1976) was an American football, basketball, and baseball. He served as the head basketball coach at East Texas State Teachers College—now known a Texas A&M University–Commerce—from 1936 to 1946 and Midwestern University—now known as Midwestern State University—in Wichita Falls, Texas from 1956 to 1970, compiling a career college basketball coaching record of 351–214. Vinzant was also the head football coach at East Texas State in 1942, tallying a mark of 4–3–1, and the head baseball coach at Tulane University from 1952 to 1954, amassing a record of 37–22–1.

Vinzant attended North Side High School in Fort Worth, Texas, where he played football. He then moved on to Texas Tech University, where he played football as an end. He also lettered in basketball and track before graduating in 1931. He earned a master's degree from East Texas State in 1937.

Vinzant began his coaching career as an assistant coach at Greenville High School in Greenville, Texas under Henry Frnka. He was appointed head coach at Greenville in 1936 when Frnka left to take a job as freshman coach at Vanderbilt University. But Vinzant then left for East Texas State to become head basketball coach and line coach for the football team, succeeding, S. J. "Red" Perry Jr., who had died of a cerebral hemorrhage.

In 1946, Vinzant reunited with Frnka, who had been hired as the head football coach at Tulane, when he was he was appointed as chief assistant to Frnka.

Vinzant died of cancer, on June 22, 1976, at hospital in Wichita Falls.

Head coaching record

Football

Basketball

Baseball

References

External links
 

1906 births
1976 deaths
American football ends
Midwestern State Mustangs football coaches
Midwestern State Mustangs men's basketball coaches
Texas Tech Red Raiders basketball players
Texas Tech Red Raiders football players
Texas Tech Red Raiders men's track and field athletes
Tulane Green Wave baseball coaches
Tulane Green Wave football coaches
Texas A&M–Commerce Lions football coaches
Texas A&M–Commerce Lions men's basketball coaches
Sportspeople from Fort Worth, Texas
Coaches of American football from Texas
Players of American football from Fort Worth, Texas
Baseball coaches from Texas
Basketball coaches from Texas
Basketball players from Texas
Track and field athletes from Texas
Deaths from cancer in Texas